The Wawa Travellers were a Junior "B" team based out of Wawa, Ontario.  They played in the North of Superior Junior B Hockey League.

History
The Travellers played in all eight of the NSHL's seasons.  After a slow start, the team moved through the standings and in their final two seasons they topped the league, winning the league championship, in both 2002-03 and 2003-04.  Despite two championships, the Travellers finished their story in 2004 with a 4-straight-losses to the Thunder Bay Northern Hawks of Thunder Bay Junior B Hockey League in the Northern Ontario Regional Junior B Hockey Championship.

After the 2003-04 season, the Thessalon Flyers and Aguasabon River Rats left the NSHL.  With only the Travellers and the Marathon Renegades left in the league, it folded.

The Marathon Renegades joined the Superior International Junior Hockey League in 2006-07.  Wawa has been trying to join the SIJHL since 2005, but has been left on the outside looking in until they can find adequate financial backing.

Season-by-season results

(*) There are no complete stats available for this season.

External links
First Official Wawa Webpage
Last known Official Wawa Webpage

Ice hockey teams in Ontario
Defunct ice hockey teams in Canada
Sport in Northern Ontario